Nenad Mijatović (Cyrillic: Ненад Мијатовић; born January 22, 1987) is a Montenegrin professional basketball player. He last played for RSB Berkane in Morocco.

Professional career
Mijatović was born in Split, Croatia, but moved with his family to Montenegro in the early 1990s, immediately joining the youth system of Budućnost Podgorica. Mijatović was an exceptional talent, so much that he made his professional debut at the age of 14. He kept developing his game as it was expected, and by the age of 18, he was one of the best young players in Serbia and Montenegro. However, in 2007, Mijatović suffered a leg injury that slowed his progress. In the following seasons, Mijatović also had stints abroad, in Spain and Turkey, but failed to make an impression.

National team
Mijatović won three gold medals with the junior national teams of Serbia and Montenegro at the FIBA tournaments. After Montenegro became independent country, Mijatović represented their national team.

External links
 Nenad Mijatović at acb.com
 Nenad Mijatović at tblstat.net
 Nenad Mijatović at draftexpress.com
 Nenad Mijatović at eurocupbasketball.com

1987 births
Living people
ABA League players
BC Kyiv players
CB Murcia players
KK Budućnost players
KK Lovćen players
KK Sloga players
Liga ACB players
Mersin Büyükşehir Belediyesi S.K. players
Montenegrin expatriate basketball people in Serbia
Montenegrin men's basketball players
Basketball players from Split, Croatia
Point guards
Shooting guards